Refusal may refer to:

 "The Refusal", a 1920 short story by Franz Kafka
 Refusals and runouts, a concept in equestrianism
 Refusal of work
 Refusal to deal
 Refusal of medical assistance
 Refusal skills
 Driven to refusal, an engineering/surveying term used in pile-driving

See also

Refuse
Refused

Denial (disambiguation)
Deny (disambiguation)